Fort Bayard is an unincorporated community, in Grant County, New Mexico, United States.

History 

In 1888, Kentuckian chaplain Allen Allensworth moved with his regiment to Fort Bayard, becoming a military educator. In 1889, Allensworth published the pamphlet Outline of Course of Study, and The Rules Governing Post Schools of Ft. Bayard, N.M., which became a military education standard.

Also in 1888, United States Army officer Geoffrey Keyes was born in Fort Bayard; he would become significant for his time in Italy during World War II.

In 1926, Supreme Court judge Harry Stowers was born in Fort Bayard.

Climate
Fort Bayard has a hot-summer Mediterranean climate (Köppen Csa) with hot summers and mild winters

Notes

Unincorporated communities in Grant County, New Mexico
Unincorporated communities in New Mexico